This table lists players with 11 or more wins on the Ladies European Tour. It does not include official wins on other professional tours, of which a few of the golfers listed, such as Laura Davies and Annika Sörenstam, have many.

Members of the World Golf Hall of Fame are annotated HoF.

The list is complete through the 2021 season.

"T" indicates tied for ranking position

References

Ladies European Tour
 A
Ladies European Tour
Ladies European Tour wins